Loborika Favorit Team was a Croatian UCI Continental cycling team that existed from 2009 until 2012.

References

Cycling teams based in Croatia
Cycling teams established in 2009
Cycling teams disestablished in 2012
UCI Continental Teams (Europe)